Crow Lake is a lake in Yukon-Koyukuk Census Area, Alaska, United States,  south of Moose Lake and  northwest of Roundabout Mountain.

References

Lakes of Alaska
Bodies of water of Yukon–Koyukuk Census Area, Alaska